The Ghadir Arena of Urmia is an indoor sports arena in Urmia, Iran. It is the home stadium of Volleyball Super League team Shahrdari Urmia. The stadium can hold up to 6,000 people. The Ghadir Arena in terms of ceiling height, distance to the spectators, type of flooring and equipment is the best volleyball hall for Tournament in Iran.

References

Indoor arenas in Iran
Sports venues in Urmia
Buildings and structures in Urmia
Sport in West Azerbaijan Province